Bruno Dias Souza (born 6 October 1925) is an Indian architect. He is credited with having "belonged to a generation of architects that sought to rediscover what Modern architecture meant for India" and having had an "illustrious architectural career".

Contemporaries

His contemporaries were Charles Correa and Raj Rewal.

Career
Souza was educated at Columbia and Harvard. He spent his early years as a young professor and practitioner at the prominent School of Planning and Architecture (SPA), in New Delhi. He also served as a United Nations consultant, won the national competition for the Goa High Court, besides receiving a special honor from the Government of Portugal.
His acclaimed works include Okhla Parish Church and Loretto Convent in New Delhi, his own house Altinho in Panjim, Goa, the Goa Assembly, and other World Bank-UNESCO  projects.
Souza has worked on projects in Sudan, Vietnam, Liberia, Republic of Cape Verde and the Republic of Guinea. He served as the Director of the School of Planning and Architecture from 1983 to 1988. 
In Goa, Souza has been critical of bureaucratic functioning and corruption in the system, where he won two competitions but was edged out of the same.

Collections archived
The Ahmedabad-based CEPT University Archives has undertaken the archiving of Souza's collections digitally and also through Oral History Recordings. This archive will include hand drawings, photographs, magazine articles and other related material from architect Souza's work.

Early years
Souza is known to have grown up in the Goa village of Badem, Salvador do Mundo, and building models of boats and little houses as a child. 
He was educated at the Liceu Nacional Afonso de Albuquerque in the then Portuguese-ruled Goa. He moved to Dharwad and Bombay for inter-science and a stint in mathematics and physics as part of the B.Sc. programme at St Xavier's College. 
After his undergraduation and postgraduation in the United States, he worked for international firms in Central as well as South America—including in Brasilia, Brasil,  before returning to Goa. In Goa, still under Portuguese rule, he designed government primary and secondary schools.

Views on the Goan capital
Souza has argued that the Goan capital of Panjim is "forgetting its past by trying to redesign open spaces." He has argued that the scenic capital "was a space of parks...."

References

1925 births
Living people
People from Goa
Indian architects